Matthew Deane may refer to:

Sir Matthew Deane, 1st Baronet (c. 1626–1711) of the Deane Baronets
Sir Matthew Deane, 3rd Baronet (c. 1680–1747), Irish MP for Charleville and Cork County
Sir Matthew Deane, 4th Baronet (c. 1706–1751), his son, Irish MP for Cork City
Matthew Deane (actor) (born 1978), Thai actor and TV host

See also
Matt Dean, Minnesota politician
Deane (surname)